Aquin is a commune in the Aquin Arrondissement, in the Sud department of Haiti. It is a port on the south coast of the Tiburon Peninsula. It had 104,216 inhabitants in 2015, up from 1,799 in 1950.

Settlements

References 

Populated places in Sud (department)
Communes of Haiti
Port cities in the Caribbean